Tropical Airplay is a chart published by Billboard magazine that ranks the top-performing songs (regardless of genre or language) on tropical radio stations in the United States, based on weekly airplay data compiled by Nielsen's Broadcast Data Systems. It is a subchart of Hot Latin Songs, which lists the best-performing Spanish-language songs in the country. In 1997, 11 songs topped the chart, in 52 issues of the magazine.

The first number one of the year was "No Quiero Na' Regala'o" by Gilberto Santa Rosa, which had been in the top spot since the issue dated December 21, 1996, and spent a total of three weeks at this position. It was succeeded by Grupo Manía's song "Linda Eh", which remained on top of the chart for four weeks. American singer Frankie Negrón released his debut album Con Amor Se Gana (1997), which was promoted by its singles "Inolvidable" (a cover version of Italian singer Laura Pausini's song) and "Hoy Me He Vuelto a Enamorar". Negrón spent 12 weeks at number one and "Inolvidable" was named the best-performing track of the year on the Tropical Airplay chart by the magazine. 

Brenda K. Starr achieved her first chart-topper with a salsa cover of Myriam Hernández's ballad "Herida". Starr had previously established herself as a freestyle artist in the 1980s and returned to the music scene as a salsa artist with Te Sigo Esperando (1997) following the commercial failure of her previous album By Heart (1991). She was the only female artist to have a number one on the Tropical Airplay chart in 1997. "Dile a Ella" by Víctor Manuelle held the top spot for the longest in 1997 at nine weeks. The final number one of the year was "Y Hubo Alguien" by Marc Anthony which spent eight weeks at number one and became the first salsa song to top the Hot Latin Songs chart.

Chart history

See also
1997 in Latin music

References

1997
United States Latin Tropical Airplay
1997 in Latin music